Housatonic Area Regional Transit, known popularly as HARTransit (formerly as HART), is the provider of public transportation for Danbury, Connecticut and surrounding communities. HARTransit was founded in 1972 as the Danbury-Bethel Transit District by the two municipalities.  The name was changed to Housatonic Area Regional Transit in 1979 after the addition of other municipal members. The agency receives funding from municipal contracts, the Connecticut Department of Transportation, Federal Transit Administration and (on a limited basis) the New York State Department of Transportation. Prior to HARTransit's establishment, Danbury had gone without transit service since 1967 when the privately owned ABC Bus Company which had replaced the Candlewood Bus Company a few months before, ceased operations. The first local bus transit operator in the area, Danbury Power & Transportation Company, operated  bus services in Danbury and Bethel from 1926 to 1965. HARTransit provides service to a greater number of towns than its predecessors.

In 2009, HARTransit was recognized as the Urban Community Transportation System of the Year by the Community Transportation Association of America (CTAA).

The municipalities served by HARTransit are as follows:
Connecticut: Danbury, Bethel, Brookfield, New Fairfield, New Milford, Newtown, Bethel, Redding, Roxbury, and Ridgefield. Norwalk and Wilton also see limited HARTransit service but are served primarily by the Norwalk Transit District WHEELS Services.
New York: Brewster, Katonah, Lewisboro and Southeast. Brewster and Southeast are also served by PART, while Katonah is primarily served by the Bee-Line Bus System.

Services
HART currently provides the following services:
Urban Fixed Route: HART operates 7 urban fixed routes which run on a "pulse point" system in which all buses meet at a terminal in downtown Danbury to easily facilitate transfers. The site is near the Danbury Metro-North station and adjacent to the Peter Pan bus station.
1 Hospital/Town Park
2 Stony Hill Rd/Newtown Rd
3 Mill Plain/Brewster
4 Brookfield
5 Bethel Center
6 Danbury Fair Mall/Lake Ave
7 New Milford
Route 7 Link, operated formerly along with WHEELS, is a weekday-only commuter line which connects Danbury to Norwalk and surrounding communities now solely run by HART.
SweetHART: HARTransit operates ADA paratransit service for the disabled  which parallels the hours and service area of the fixed route system. This service is not offered to those in WHEELS territory or New York.  HARTransit also operates Senior (65 or older)/disabled SweetHART dial-a-ride service for Bethel, Brookfield, Danbury, Newtown, New Fairfield and Ridgefield.  Dial-a-ride hours and policies vary by municipality.
Bus to Rail Service: Peak hour shuttles which connect Danbury to the Brewster station on the Harlem Line and Ridgefield to Katonah, also on the Harlem Line. A third shuttle, connecting New Fairfield to Southeast, began operations in 2009.
Danbury-Brewster 
Ridgefield-Katonah 
New Fairfield-Southeast 
Nighttime/Sunday LOOP services: Three routes serving Danbury, New Milford, Brookfield and Bethel which operate during nighttime hours and on Sundays and holidays to offer increased economic opportunities to low-income workers though anyone can use these services.
Mall-Hospital LOOP
Newtown Road-South Street LOOP
New Milford LOOP
Saturday Trolley: Starting on June 25, 2016, the Saturday Trolley began operations and is free to ride. It operates during the season in which the Danbury Farmer's Market is open and makes stops at West & Main, Park Ave. School, Wooster Manor, Elmwood Hall, Roger's Park, Walgreens, Danbury Library, and then the Pulse Point which is located on one side of Kennedy Park where the Farmer's Market is held, the other side holding the Peter Pan bus station along with several businesses.

Current Fleet

HARTransit uses Startrans and Goshen Coach body-on-chassis buses for SweetHART, rail shuttles and LOOP routes.

Retired Fleet
HARTransit previously operated TMC CityCruisers, Nova Bus Rapid Transit Series (RTS) buses, Orion I, II, V and VII buses, as well as Cable Car Concepts and DuponTrolley replica trolley buses.

See also
Norwalk Transit District
Putnam Transit
Bee-Line Bus System

References

External links

HARTransit Homepage
History of transit in Greater Danbury, CT

Bus transportation in Connecticut
Bus transportation in New York (state)
Organizations established in 1972
Transportation in Putnam County, New York
Transportation in Litchfield County, Connecticut
Transportation in Fairfield County, Connecticut
Danbury, Connecticut
Surface transportation in Greater New York
Transit agencies in Connecticut